This is a list of films produced by the Telugu film industry based in Chennai in 1959.

1959
Telugu
Telugu films